Saint Ailill the First (also called Ailill the Elder, Ailill I, Ailiell, Ailild, Ailid, Alild, Ailillus, Alellus, Alildus, Oilill, Oileal, Oileald, Olildus, Olild, Elias, Eulalius, Helias) born c. 460 – died 13 January 526, was the Bishop of Armagh, Ireland from 513 to 13 January 526.

Genealogy and birth 
 
St. Ailill was a member of the Úi Bressail, a clan from the south side of Lough Neagh. He was born in Drum Cád in the Barony of Oneilland East, County Armagh, like his successor and kinsman Ailill the Second. He is sometimes confused with either or all of St. Ailill, Abbot of Moville; Ailill son of Trichem, St. Patrick's disciple & Ailill the Second of Armagh.

Bishop of Armagh 
 
On the death of Saint Dubthach the First, the Bishop of Armagh, in 513, St. Ailill was appointed as the 8th Bishop in succession to Saint Patrick. Saint Ailill reigned as Bishop for 13 years.

Death 
 
St. Ailill died 13 January 526. The Annals of Ireland give the following obits- 
 
 Chronicon Scotorum 518- "Ailill, Abbot of Ardmacha, slept" 
 Annals of Tigernach 520- "Ailill abbot of Armagh" 
 Annals of Clonmacnoise 522- "Aillill abbott of Ardmacha, dyed" 
 Annals from the Book of Leinster 523- "Ailill, the first, abbot of Armagh" 
 Annals of the Four Masters 525- "Ailill, Bishop of Armagh, who was of the Ui Breasail, died" 
 Annals of Ulster 526- "Ailill of the Uí Bresail, bishop of Ard Macha, rested"

Feast day 
 
After his death St. Ailill was venerated as a saint and his feast was celebrated each 13 January, the day of his death. The Calendars of the Saints have the following entries- 
 
 Martyrology of Gorman 13 January- "Ailill, bishop of Ard Macha" 
 Martyrology of Tallaght 13 January- "Ailill Epis" 
 Martyrology of Donegal 13 January- "Ailell, Bishop, of Ard-Macha, A.D., 525"

References 

460s births
526 deaths
Year of birth uncertain
Bishops of Armagh
6th-century Irish bishops